Agrobiology is the science of plant nutrition and growth in relation to soil conditions, especially to determine ways to increase crop yields. 
Agrobiology is generally concerned with:

 Animal health and welfare
 Plant Nutrition and Health
 Organic Agriculture

The term given by wilcox. There are several universities providing courses of agrobiology e.g. at Aarhus University. There also is a Journal of Agrobiology published in the Czech Republic.

References 

 Definition of agrobiology at TheFreeDictionary.com.
 Oswin W. Wilcoxon - Principles of Agrobiology. Palmer Publishing Co., New York 1930.

External links 
 

Agronomy
Fertilizers